= Franken (Stralsund) =

Area of Stralsund, Germany

Coordinates: 54°18′02″N 13°06′10″E

Franken is an urban area in the east of Stralsund, Mecklenburg-Vorpommern, Germany. It is divided into the districts of Frankenvorstadt, Dänholm, Franken-Mitte and Frankensiedlung.
